The following are the national records in Olympic weightlifting in Peru. Records are maintained in each weight class for the snatch lift, clean and jerk lift, and the total for both lifts by the Federación Deportiva Peruana de Levantamiento de Pesas (FDPLP).

Men

Women

References

External links
FDPLP official web site

Peru
Peru
Olympic weightlifting
weightlifting